Bagneux–Lucie Aubrac is a Paris Métro station in Bagneux, Hauts-de-Seine. It is the southern terminus of Line 4, and was built as part of a two-station southward extension from Mairie de Montrouge, the previous terminus of the line. The adjacent station is Barbara. The station opened in January 2022. In future, the station will be served by Paris Métro Line 15.

History 
The extension of Line 4 south from Mairie de Montrouge received déclaration d'utilité publique in February 2005. Work to built the extension began in 2015, and was planned to open in 2020. During the planning stages of the extension, the station was tentatively called Bagneux. Following a public vote, the station was named after Lucie Aubrac, a member of the French Resistance during World War II.

The station was opened on 13 January 2022 by Prime Minister Jean Castex. The extension is expected to bring 37,000 new passengers per day. The cost of the extension was 406 million euro, split between Ile-de-France Region (60%), the state (25.7%), and the department of Hauts-de-Seine, in which Bagneux is located (14.3%).

Grand Paris Express 
In 2011, it was announced that the station will connect to the new Paris Métro Line 15, part of Grand Paris Express. This is planned to open in 2025. There are also plans to build an eco-quarter around the station with over 2,000 new residents, following the completion of the Line 15 station.

Architecture and artwork

Line 4 
The station was designed by LIN (Finn Geipel and Giulia Andi). It is fitted with platform edge doors, as part of the automation of Line 4, planned to be completed by 2022. 

Inside the station, two portraits of Lucie Aubrac were created by the artist C215. On a gable of a building outside the station, artist Andréa Michaelsson (also known as Btoy) has painted a large portrait of Lucie Aubrac. On the nearby maintenance building, a metal bas-relief by Argentinian artist Ricardo Mosner shows the history of underground mines, quarries and the Metro in the local area.

Line 15 
The station has been designed by French architect Marc Barani. An artwork by Italian artist Tatiana Trouvé will take inspiration from caves, fossils and troglodytes.

References 

Paris Métro stations in Bagneux
2022 establishments in France
Railway stations in France opened in 2022